CH-18 was a  of the Imperial Japanese Navy during World War II.

History
CH-18 was laid down by Nippon Kokan K. K. at their Tsurumi Shipyard in 1941, launched on 23 April 1941, and completed and commissioned on 31 July 1941.

On 30 December 1944, she was attacked and sunk near Santiago Island, Luzon by 26 land-based aircraft of the United States Fifth Air Force consisting of B-25 Mitchell medium bombers, A-20 Havoc light bombers, and P-40 Warhawk fighters while conducting escort duty. 

CH-18 was struck from the Navy List on 10 March 1945.

References

Additional references
 
 
 

1941 ships
No.13-class submarine chasers
Maritime incidents in December 1944
World War II shipwrecks in the Pacific Ocean
Ships sunk by US aircraft